Louis Marie Devillié (29 May 1905 – 14 December 1976) was a French rower. He competed at the 1928 Summer Olympics in Amsterdam with the men's coxless four where they were eliminated in the round one repechage.

References

1905 births
1976 deaths
French male rowers
Olympic rowers of France
Rowers at the 1928 Summer Olympics
Rowers at the 1936 Summer Olympics
European Rowing Championships medalists